Priodas Pum Mil (English: Five Thousand Pound Wedding) is a Welsh reality television show which is produced for S4C and also available on BBC iPlayer. The show follows Welsh couples as they prepare to get married for less than £5,000. Trystan Ellis-Morris and Emma Walford present the series, with Alaw Griffiths, a wedding planner from Aberystwyth, at hand to offer help and guidance. The show format is similar to the successful British TV series Don't Tell the Bride but varies by requiring friends, family and the show's hosts to do the organisation.

Format
The show's format consists of a couple who are given £5,000 to spend on their wedding, and inviting their family and friends to arrange the day with the help of the presenters. The couple do not get to know any details of the arrangements but the hope is that they will enjoy an unforgettable day. The wedding ceremony must be organised; every aspect of event and attire, including the wedding dress, as well as the transportation, location, food and surprising the bride and groom. Although the series mostly features heterosexual couples, some episodes broadcast features gay and lesbian couples.

Episodes

Series 1 (2016)

Series 2 (2017−2018)

Series 3 (2019)

Series 4 (2020)

Lockdown Special (2020)

Live Special (2021)

Series 5 (2021)

Christmas Special (2021)

Christmas Special (2022)

Prosiect Pum Mil

Premise

This series is part of the "Priodas Pum Mil" brand with many elements common to both formats, with the Welsh community at the heart of the series. This is an ambitious series where teams of characters from different communities will undertake a building and refurbishment project that will benefit their community or area – a project that will leave a legacy. This time they’ll be travelling the length and breadth of Wales trying to create community projects for just five thousand pounds.

Episodes

Awards and nominations

References 

S4C original programming
2010s Welsh television series
Wedding television shows